Parau is a locality of West Auckland in the Auckland Region. It is under the local governance of the Waitākere Ranges Local Board within the Auckland Council. It is a coastal community close to Titirangi village. Parau is made up of Huia Road, one other looping street called Rauhuia Crescent and two cul de sacs, Staley Road and Shirley Road. It also consists of a safe clean beach called Armour Bay where locals can partake in tennis, and swimming in the Manukau Harbour which laps the beach.

Geography

The Parau area is dominated by pōhutukawa/rata sheltered coastal fringe forest. Higher elevation areas of the peninsula and mainlands are predominantly a warm lowlands pūriri forest.

History

Parau is close to the site of the 1740s battle between Te Taoū hapū of Ngāti Whātua and Kiwi Tāmaki of Waiohua (now underneath the Lower Nihotupu Reservoir).

During the mid-19th century, the area was deforested for kauri timber, and later formed by Duff and Marshall Laing, sons of George Laing who had settled at Laingholm. The western shores of Big Muddy Creek were farmed by the Armour family, while the eastern shores were owned by Jermyn Symonds. The farming settlement that developed around the area became known as Brooklyn by the late 19th century. In the early 20th century, Duff Laing continued to run a dairy farm in the area, and the Flemish-Belgian De Brabandere family ran a sheep and dairy farm owned by the Flemish-Belgian De Brabandere family.

The name of the post office was changed to Parau in the late 1910s. In the mid-1910s, construction began on Upper Nihotupu Dam, leading Parau to develop as an area where workers families settled. Material for the dam was sent to Big Muddy Creek by barge, then transported to the dam site by a tramway. The dam finished construction in 1923, after which Parau became popular with holidaymakers and retirees, when many of the workers families left. The Big Muddy Creek and Huia valleys reforested in native bush, which impressed residents and sparked much of the movement for the formation of a nature reserve. The Auckland Centennial Memorial Park (which later grew to form the Waitākere Ranges Regional Park opened in 1940.

A second dam at Parau was constructed between the 1940s and 1960s, known as the Lower Nihotupu Dam. This dam, much closer to the township, flooded most of the flat land where the Laing farm had previously been located.

Demographics
It is part of the Oratia statistical area.

Parau had a population of 501 at the 2018 New Zealand census, an increase of 30 people (6.4%) since the 2013 census, and an increase of 57 people (12.8%) since the 2006 census. There were 171 households, comprising 270 males and 231 females, giving a sex ratio of 1.17 males per female, with 111 people (22.2%) aged under 15 years, 90 (18.0%) aged 15 to 29, 270 (53.9%) aged 30 to 64, and 30 (6.0%) aged 65 or older.

Ethnicities were 92.2% European/Pākehā, 10.8% Māori, 2.4% Pacific peoples, 6.6% Asian, and 4.2% other ethnicities. People may identify with more than one ethnicity.

Although some people chose not to answer the census's question about religious affiliation, 64.7% had no religion, 22.2% were Christian, 0.6% had Māori religious beliefs, 0.6% were Buddhist and 4.8% had other religions.

Of those at least 15 years old, 108 (27.7%) people had a bachelor's or higher degree, and 45 (11.5%) people had no formal qualifications. 90 people (23.1%) earned over $70,000 compared to 17.2% nationally. The employment status of those at least 15 was that 219 (56.2%) people were employed full-time, 72 (18.5%) were part-time, and 9 (2.3%) were unemployed.

Gallery

Notes

References

External links
Photographs of Parau held in Auckland Libraries' heritage collections.

Populated places in the Auckland Region
Waitākere Ranges Local Board Area
Waitākere Ranges
Populated places around the Manukau Harbour
West Auckland, New Zealand